Krawczyk is the 17th most common surname in Poland (64,543 people in 2009).  Tailor's Son is an English translation of the name. The Polish root krawiec translates as tailor and the suffix czyk as son of.

Notable people with this name include:
 Albert Krawczyk (born 1934), American politician who served three terms in the Vermont House of Representatives
 Andrzej Krawczyk (born 1976), Polish discus thrower
 Andy Krawczyk, The Wire character 
 Betty Krawczyk (born 1928), North American environmental activist, author and former political candidate
 Bogusław Krawczyk (1906–1941), submarine commander of the Polish Navy during World War II
 Desirae Krawczyk (born 1994), American tennis player
 Eliana Krawczyk, Argentine military officer
 Gérard Krawczyk, French film director
 Glenn Krawczyk, Icehouse (band) guitarist
 Henry Krawczyk (born 1946), American sprint canoer
 Henryk Krawczyk (born 1946), professor and rector of Gdańsk University of Technology
 Hugo Krawczyk, Argentine-Israeli cryptographer
 Jacek Krawczyk (born 1949), Polish swimmer
 Jan Krawczyk (1956–2018), Polish racing cyclist
 Janusz Krawczyk, Polish luger
 Jason Krawczyk, director
 Jerzy Krawczyk (1928–2008), Polish boxer
 Johanna Krawczyk (born 1984), French writer and screenwriter
 Joseph L. Krawczyk Jr. (born 1947), Republican politician who was elected and served in the Vermont House of Representatives
 Judy Krawczyk (born 1939), American Republican politician from Wisconsin
 Karina Krawczyk, German actress
 Karol Krawczyk, Miodowe lata character
 Katarzyna Krawczyk (born 1990), Polish wrestler
 Krzysztof Krawczyk (1946–2021), Polish pop singer
 Krzysztof Krawczyk (born 1962), Polish former high jumper
 Marek Krawczyk (born 1976), Polish breaststroke swimmer
 Marianne Krawczyk (born 1964), American screenwriter and video game writer
 Monika Krawczyk, Polish road cyclist
 Piotr Krawczyk (born 1994), Polish footballer
 Ray Krawczyk (born 1959), American professional baseball player
 Richard Krawczyk (born 1947), French retired professional football midfielder
 Robert Krawczyk (born 1978), Polish judoka
 Sławomir Krawczyk (born 1963), Polish road cyclist
 Stephan Krawczyk (born 1955), German writer and songwriter
 Szymon Krawczyk (born 1998), Polish cyclist
 Tadeusz Krawczyk (born 1959), Polish racing cyclist

References

Polish-language surnames
Occupational surnames